"Working Woman" is a song co-written and recorded by American country music artist Rob Crosby.  It was released in January 1992 as the fourth single from the album Solid Ground.  The song reached #28 on the Billboard Hot Country Singles & Tracks chart.  The song was written by Crosby, Tim DuBois and Will Robinson.

Chart performance

References

1992 singles
1990 songs
Rob Crosby songs
Songs written by Rob Crosby
Songs written by Tim DuBois
Songs written by Will Robinson (songwriter)
Song recordings produced by Scott Hendricks
Arista Records singles